Zetter may refer to:

People

Felipe Zetter (1923–2013), Mexican football player
Kim Zetter, American journalist
Miriam Zetter (born 1989), Mexican ten-pin bowler

Places
Zetter Hotel, a hotel in London.